The ancient legend of Orpheus and Eurydice (Orpheus, Eurydikē) concerns the fateful love of Orpheus of Thrace for the beautiful Eurydice. Orpheus was the son of Apollo and the muse Calliope. It may be a late addition to the Orpheus myths, as the latter cult-title suggests those attached to Persephone. It may have been derived from a legend in which Orpheus travels to Tartarus and charms the goddess Hecate. The subject is among the most frequently retold of all Greek myths, being featured in numerous works of literature, operas, ballets, paintings, plays and more recently, films and video games.

Versions 

In Virgil's classic version of the legend, it completes his Georgics, a poem on the subject of agriculture. Here the name of Aristaeus, or Aristaios, the keeper of bees, and the tragic conclusion was first introduced.

Ovid's version of the myth, in his Metamorphoses, was published a few decades later and employs a different poetic emphasis and purpose. It relates that Eurydice's death was not caused by fleeing from Aristaeus, but by dancing with naiads on her wedding day.

Other ancient writers treated Orpheus's visit to the underworld more negatively. According to Phaedrus in Plato's Symposium, the infernal deities only "presented an apparition" of Eurydice to him. Plato's representation of Orpheus is in fact that of a coward; instead of choosing to die in order to be with his love, he mocked the deities in an attempt to visit Hades, to get her back alive. As his love was not "true"—meaning that he was not willing to die for it—he was punished by the deities, first by giving him only the apparition of his former wife in the underworld and then by having him killed by women.

Plot 

Apollo gave his son Orpheus a lyre and taught him how to play. It had been said that "nothing could resist Orpheus's beautiful melodies, neither enemies nor beasts." Orpheus fell in love with Eurydice, a woman of beauty and grace, whom he married and lived with happily for a short time. However, when Hymen was called to bless the marriage, he predicted that their perfection was not meant to last.

A short time after this prophecy, Eurydice was wandering in the forest with the Nymphs. In some versions of the story, the shepherd Aristaeus saw her, and beguiled by her beauty, made advances towards her and began to chase her. Other versions of the story relate that Eurydice was merely dancing with the Nymphs. While fleeing or dancing, she was bitten by a snake and died instantly. Orpheus sung his grief with his lyre and managed to move everything, living or not, in the world; both humans and gods learnt about his sorrow and grief.

At some point, Orpheus decided to descend to Hades by music to see his wife. Any other mortal would have died, but Orpheus, being protected by the gods, went to Hades and arrived at the Stygian realm, passing by ghosts and souls of people unknown. He also managed to attract Cerberus, the three-headed dog, with a liking for his music. He presented himself in front of the god of the Greek underworld, Hades and his wife, Persephone.

Orpheus played with his lyre a song so heartbreaking that even Hades was moved to compassion. The god told Orpheus that he could take Eurydice back with him, but under one condition: she would have to follow behind him while walking out from the caves of the underworld, and he could not turn to look at her as they walked.

Thinking it a simple task for a patient man like himself, Orpheus was delighted; he thanked Hades and left to ascend back into the living world. Unable to hear Eurydice's footsteps, however, he began to fear the gods had fooled him. Eurydice might have been behind him, but as a shade, having to come back into the light to become a full woman again. Only a few feet away from the exit, Orpheus lost his faith and turned to see Eurydice behind him, sending her back to be trapped in Hades' reign forever.

Orpheus tried to return to the underworld but was unable to, possibly because a person cannot enter the realm of Hades twice while alive. According to various versions of the myth, he played a mourning song with his lyre, calling for death so that he could be united with Eurydice forever. He was killed either by beasts tearing him apart, or by the Maenads, in a frenzied mood. His head remained fully intact, and still sang as it floated in the water before washing up on the island of Lesbos. According to another version, Zeus decided to strike him with lightning knowing Orpheus might reveal the secrets of the underworld to humans. In this telling, the Muses decided to save his head and keep it among the living people to sing forever, enchanting everyone with his melodies. They additionally cast his lyre into the sky as a constellation.

Retellings

Literature 
 The Death of Eurydice episode which occurs in Book IV of Georgics by Virgil (29 BC) and Book X of Metamorphoses by Ovid (8 AD)
 The poem "Orpheus and Eurydice" in The Consolation of Philosophy by Boethius (594 AD)
 Sir Orfeo, an anonymous narrative poem (c. late thirteenth or early fourteenth century)
 The Tale of Orpheus and Erudices his Quene, a poem by Robert Henryson (c.1470)
"Orpheus. Eurydike. Hermes", a poem by Rainer Maria Rilke (1907)
 Sonnets to Orpheus, an allusive sonnet sequence by poet Rainer Maria Rilke (1922)
The Song of Orpheus, part of volume 6 (Fables and Reflections) of the Sandman by Neil Gaiman (1990)
Enchanted Fire, a romance novel by Roberta Gellis (1996)
 The Ground Beneath Her Feet, novel by Salman Rushdie (1999)
 "Eurydice", a poem by Carol Ann Duffy in her collection of poems, The World's Wife (1999)
 Veniss Underground, a novel by Jeff Vandermeer (2003)
 Poetry and Fear, a novel by Grace Andreacchi (2008)
 "Syringa", a poem by John Ashbery, later set to music by Elliott Carter
 "Hymn to Persephone", a poem by Craig Arnold in Made Flesh (2008)
 "Cocktails with Orpheus", a poem by Terrance Hayes (2008)
 A Song for Ella Grey, a novel by David Almond
 Bone Gap, a novel by Laura Ruby
 Goat Song, a novelette by Poul Anderson (1972)
 "Eurydice's Footnote", a 1995 poem by A. E. Stallings
 "The Underground", a 1984 poem by Seamus Heaney
 Asterios Polyp, a graphic novel by David Mazzucchelli (2009)

Film and stage 
 The Orphic Trilogy, a series of films by Jean Cocteau (1930–1959)
 Eurydice, a play by Jean Anouilh (1941)
 Orfeu da Conceição, a play by Vinicius de Moraes (1956)
 Orpheus Descending, a play by Tennessee Williams (1957)
 Black Orpheus, a film by Marcel Camus (1959)
 Evrydiki BA 2O37, a film directed by Nikos Nikolaidis (1975)
 Parking, a film by Jacques Demy (1985)
 Shredder Orpheus, a film by Robert McGinley (1989)
 An episode of The StoryTeller: Greek Myths (1990)
 Highway to Hell, a very, very loose adaptation film by Ate de Jong (1992).
 What Dreams May Come, a film by Vincent Ward (1998) 
 Orfeu, film by Cacá Diegues (1999)
 Metamorphoses, play by Mary Zimmerman (2002)
 Eurydice, play by Sarah Ruhl (2003)
 Hadestown, folk opera by Anaïs Mitchell (2006)
 Orpheus and Eurydice: A Myth Underground, a theatre production written by Molly Davies with music by James Johnston, Nick Cave and the Bad Seeds for the National Youth Theatre at the Old Vic Tunnels, directed by James Dacre (2011)
 You Ain't Seen Nothin' Yet, a film by Alain Resnais (2012)
 Jasper in Deadland, a musical by Hunter Foster and Ryan Scott Oliver (2014)
 Hadestown, an expansion of the folk opera by Anaïs Mitchell, directed by Rachel Chavkin, that premiered at the New York Theatre Workshop in 2016 before eventually transferring to Broadway in 2019. (2017)
 Paris 05:59: Théo & Hugo, a French film (2016) by Olivier Ducastel and Jacques Martineau, queering the myth
 Portrait of a Lady on Fire, a film by Céline Sciamma (2019) that uses the myth as a common thread
 "The Fugitive Kind" (1960 film version of T. Williams' play "Orpheus Descending,") directed by Sidney Lumet, starring Marlon Brando, Anna Magnani, and Joanne Woodward.

Music and ballet 
 Euridice, an opera by Jacopo Peri and Giulio Caccini with librettist Ottavio Rinuccini (1600)
 Euridice, an opera by Giulio Caccini with librettist Ottavio Rinuccini (1602)
 L'Orfeo, the first opera by Monteverdi (1607)
 Orfeo, an opera by Luigi Rossi (1647)
 Orpheus, an opera by Georg Philipp Telemann (1726)
 Orpheus and Euridice, an ode by William Hayes (1735)
 Orfeo ed Euridice, an opera by Christoph Willibald Gluck (1762)
 , an opera by Ferdinando Bertoni (1776)
 Orpheus in the Underworld, an operetta by Jacques Offenbach (1858)
 Orpheus und Eurydike, an opera by Ernst Krenek (1926)
Orpheus and Eurydice, a ballet choreographed by Dame Ninette de Valois with music by Gluck (1941)
 Orpheus, a ballet made by choreographer George Balanchine to music by Igor Stravinsky (1948)
 Eruption, instrumental composition by Dutch rock band Focus, from the album Focus 2 (1971)
 Orpheus and Eurydice, a dance by Pina Bausch (1975)
 Orpheus and Eurydice, a rock opera album by Alexander Zhurbin (1975)
La Musique Des Amants, Chêne Noir 2000, Théâtre du Chêne Noir d'Avignon (1976)
 “Orpheus”, for two bassoons and marimba by David Maslanka (1977) 
 "Rubin and Cherise", a song by the Jerry Garcia Band, written by Robert Hunter and Jerry Garcia (1978)
 "Blue Orpheus", a song by Todd Rundgren on his album A Cappella (1985)
 The Mask of Orpheus, an opera by composer Harrison Birtwistle and librettist Peter Zinovieff (1986)
 Orpheus, a song by English singer-songwriter David Sylvian from the album Secrets of the Beehive (1987)
Orpheus and Eurydice, a song cycle in two acts by Ricky Ian Gordon (2005)
 Metamorpheus, an orchestral album by former Genesis guitarist Steve Hackett (2005)
 "Eurydice", a song by Sleepthief featuring Jody Quine (2006)
 Hadestown, an album of songs from the folk opera of the same name by Anaïs Mitchell (2010)
"From the Underworld", a song by the British band The Herd, written by Ken Howard and Alan Blaikley (1967)
Orpheus X, a rock opera by Rinde Eckert (2007)
 Syringa, by Elliott Carter, based on John Ashbery's poem of the same name
 Abattoir Blues/The Lyre of Orpheus, an album by Nick Cave and The Bad Seeds (2004)
 "Don't Look Back", a song by She & Him, written by Zooey Deschanel (2008)
 "Beat of her Heart", a song by Gungor (2013)
 The cover of the album Reflektor (2013) by Arcade Fire contains a picture of Auguste Rodin's sculpture of Orpheus and Eurydice. The myth is referenced in songs "Awful Sound (Oh Eurydice)", "It's Never Over (Hey Orpheus)" and "Afterlife".
 "Bring You Back", a song by Beacon (2013)
"Orpheus Under The Influence", a song by The Buttertones (2014)
 "Orpheus Mourning", a song by the Spanish band As Light Dies (2014)
 "Don't Look Back Orpheus", a song by The Ghost of a Saber Tooth Tiger (2014)
Underworld, an album by Symphony X (2015)
 Orphée, an album by Jóhann Jóhannsson (2016)
 "Eurydice in the Light", a song by Helena Ruth off the album Inherited Branches (2016)
 "Orpheus is Playing the Troubadour", a song by Charlie Fink (2017)
 "The Wind Weeps Eleanor", a song by American Murder Song off the album The Donner Party (2017)
 "Orfeusz+Euridiké", a ballet choreographed by Enrico Morelli (2018)
"Orpheus in the Underworld" Rick Springfield, The Snake King (2018)
 “Talk”, song by Hozier on the album Wasteland, Baby (2019)
 "Orpheus", a song by Sara Bareilles off the album Amidst the Chaos (2019)
 Portrait of a Lady on Fire, a film by Céline Sciamma (2019) 
 "Orpheus", a song by Shawn James on the album The Dark & The Light (2019)
 Eurydice, an opera by Matthew Aucoin with librettist Sarah Ruhl (2020)
 "Lődi", a song by Csaknekedkislány on the album Kobraszív (2020)
"Orpheus / Eurydice", a song by Velvet Rye on the album V. (2020)
 Orphee l'Amour Eurydice, opera created for the Dutch National Opera (2022)

Visual arts 

 Orpheus and Eurydice, stone relief, second century, Šempeter, Slovenia
Orpheus and Eurydice, a painting by Titian (c. 1508)
Landscape with Orpheus and Eurydice, a painting by Poussin (1650–1653)
 Orpheus and Euridice, a painting by Federico Cervelli
Orpheus Mourning the Death of Eurydice, a painting by Ary Scheffer (1814)
Orpheus Leading Eurydice from the Underworld, a painting by Jean-Baptiste-Camille Corot (1861)
 Orpheus and Eurydice, a painting by Edward Poynter (1862)
 Orpheus and Euridice, a painting by Frederic Leighton (1864)
Orpheus and Eurydice, a sculpture by Auguste Rodin (1893)
Orpheus Searching Eurydice in the Underworld, a painting by the Antwerp school
The Kiss, a painting by Gustave Klimt (1907) (Not explicitly Orpheus and Eurydice, but one interpretation of The Kiss is that it depicts their story)
 Portrait of Cosimo I de' Medici as Orpheus, a painting by Agnolo Bronzino (c. 1537-1539)

Video games 
 The Battle of Olympus, an NES and Game Boy video game by Infinity
 Don't Look Back, an Atari VCS-styled Flash game by Terry Cavanagh
 Persona 3, a video game originally designed for the PS2 in Japan; Orpheus appears as the protagonist's persona
 Dante's Inferno, developed by Visceral Games
 Oikospiel Book I, an indie game by David Kanaga
 Hades, an indie Rogue-like game developed by Supergiant Games. The player, Zagreus, meets Eurydice and Orpheus, and is given the option of reuniting them.

References

External links 

Thraco-Macedonian mythology
Mythological lovers
Love stories